A Terrible Woman (Danish: En frygtelig kvinde) is a Danish drama film from 2017, directed by Christian Tafdrup.  It was made for less than 4 million kroner and was filmed in 16 days.

A Terrible Woman premiered at CPH:PIX in October 2017. The film had its Danish premier in December 2017. selling 21,000 tickets in the first 4 days. By mid-January, A Terrible Woman had sold over 100,000 tickets.

A Terrible Woman had a controversial reception, with some female reviewers arguing its depiction of women in relationships did more harm than good. That "(Marie) goes beyond her caricatured villain to say something more general about women's allegedly deceptive nature".

Plot 
An immature and naive Rasmus meets the sophisticated Marie, thinking he has met the love of his life. To begin with everything goes perfectly, but eventually, Marie shows a darker and possessive side, and begins to expose Rasmus to emotional terror more and more often.

Cast 

Anders Juul as Rasmus
Amanda Collin as Marie
 as Troels
 as Lars
 as Pernille
Frederik Carlsen

References

External links 
 

2017 films
Danish drama films
2017 drama films